HMS Abdiel was a Royal Navy minelayer that saw service during the Cold War.

Abdiel was ordered from Thornycroft in June 1965. She was laid down at Thornycroft's Woolston shipyard on 23 May 1966 and launched 22 January 1967. She was commissioned on 17 October 1967. Her pennant number was N21.

Minelayer
Abdiel was designated by the Ministry of Defence as an "exercise minelayer" and her official role was to train Royal Navy personnel in minelaying operations using test/dummy naval mines, not to lay offensive mines operationally. She was fully capable of laying offensive mines during wartime.

MCM support ship
Abdiel fulfilled an additional role as a support ship for mine countermeasure vessels.  She served in this capacity with the Armilla Patrol from 1987 to 1988. During this deployment, the air conditioning units aboard ship proved insufficient for the climate and additional units had to be dispatched.

Refits
 1977
 1981

Paid off
Abdiel was paid off in 1988 and sold for scrapping. After her disposal, the Royal Navy had no dedicated minelaying vessel, although provisions were made for "suitably modified vessels" to undertake the work as required. In 1987 her commanding officer spoke with Raymond Baxter at the 1987 Festival of Remembrance in a segment about Royal Navy modes of communication

Media
Abdiel appears in the Royal Navy instructional film 'Minelaying' (Admiralty catalogue no. A2788) produced in 1976. Classified as restricted at the time of its release, the film is now unrestricted and available on archive DVD collections and the Internet.

References

 Couhat, Jean Labayle and A.D. Baker. Combat Fleets of the World 1986/87. Annapolis, Maryland, USA: Naval Institute Press, 1986. .
 Gardiner, Robert and Stephen Chumbley. Conway's All The World's Fighting Ships 1947–1995. Annapolis, Maryland USA: Naval Institute Press, 1995. .
 Moore, John. Jane's Fighting Ships 1985–86. London: Jane's Yearbooks, 1985. .

External links
 HMS Abdiel Facebook page
 MCM Support Ships
 "British Minesweepers" TV news report ITN, 29 September 1987

Minelayers of the Royal Navy
Cold War mine warfare vessels of the United Kingdom
Ships built in Southampton
1967 ships
Ships built by John I. Thornycroft & Company